Versols-et-Lapeyre is a commune in the Aveyron department in southern France.

Geography
The hamlets of Versols and Lapeyre lie on the right bank of the Sorgues, which flows northwest through the middle of the commune.

Population

See also
Communes of the Aveyron department

References

Communes of Aveyron
Aveyron communes articles needing translation from French Wikipedia